Seabrook Farms is an unincorporated community and census-designated place (CDP) located within Seabrook, which is in turn located in Upper Deerfield Township, in Cumberland County, New Jersey, United States. It is part of the Vineland-Millville- Bridgeton Primary Metropolitan Statistical Area for statistical purposes. At the 2010 census, Seabrook Farms's population was 1,484. Seabrook Farms is named after Charles F. Seabrook, a businessman who at one point ran the largest INTEGRATED truck farm in the world in this region.

Geography
According to the United States Census Bureau, Seabrook Farms had a total area of 2.177 square miles (5.640 km2), including 2.167 square miles (5.614 km2) of it is land and 0.010 square miles (0.026 km2) of water (0.47%) is water.

Demographics

Census 2010

Census 2000
At the 2000 census there were 1,719 people, 582 households, and 451 families residing in Seabrook Farms. The population density was 304.5/km2 (788.8/mi2). There were 607 housing units at an average density of 107.5/km2 (278.5/mi2).  The racial makeup of Seabrook Farms was 33.86% White, 54.22% African American, 0.76% Native American, 2.04% Asian, 0.06% Pacific Islander, 6.52% from other races, and 2.56% from two or more races. Hispanic or Latino of any race were 12.91% of the population.

Of the 582 households, 55.3% had children under the age of 18 living with them, 29.7% were married couples living together, 41.4% had a female householder with no husband present, and 22.5% were non-families. 19.8% of households were one person, and 8.4% were one person aged 65 or older. The average household size was 2.95 and the average family size was 3.33.

In Seabrook Farms the population was spread out, with 42.8% under the age of 18, 10.1% from 18 to 24, 26.2% from 25 to 44, 14.9% from 45 to 64, and 6.1% 65 or older. The median age was 23 years. For every 100 females, there were 85.2 males. For every 100 females age 18 and over, there were 67.5 males.

The median household income was in Seabrook Farms was $16,558, and the median family income was $22,500. Males had a median income of $24,479 versus $24,643 for females. The per capita income for Seabrook Farms was $12,499. About 28.3% of families and 34.3% of the population were below the poverty line, including 42.2% of those under age 18 and 16.8% of those age 65 or over.

References

Census-designated places in Cumberland County, New Jersey
Upper Deerfield Township, New Jersey